Iqbal Town (Urdu) is an administrative zone in Lahore, Punjab, Pakistan. It forms one of 10 zones of the Lahore metropolitan area

Neighbourhoods

See also
Local government in Punjab

References